Robert Chandler may refer to:

 Robert Chandler (MP for Devizes) (fl. 1421), English politician
 Robert Chandler (MP for Chippenham), fl.1382–1389, MP for Chippenham
 Robert Chandler (RAF officer) (1898–?), English World War I flying ace
 Robert Chandler (network executive) (1928–2008), American television executive
 Robert F. Chandler (1907–1991), horticulturalist
 Robert W. Chandler (1921–1996), American journalist, businessman, and philanthropist
 Robert Chandler (translator), British poet and translator
 Bob Chandler (1949–1995), American football player
 Bob Chandler (footballer) (1894–1964), English footballer